The South African type XM4 tender was a steam locomotive tender.

Type XM4 tenders entered service in November 1911, as tenders to the second batch of  Superheated Mallet type steam locomotives which were delivered to the Central South African Railways in that year. These locomotives were designated Class MF on the South African Railways in 1912.

Manufacturer
Type XM4 tenders were built in 1911 by the American Locomotive Company (ALCO).

In November 1911, the Central South African Railways (CSAR) placed a second batch of five  Mallet articulated compound steam locomotives in service, built by ALCO. These locomotives were designated Class MF on the South African Railways (SAR) in 1912. The Type XM4 tender entered service as tenders to these five engines.

Characteristics

It rode on diamond frame bogies with a  wheelbase per bogie.

Locomotive
In the SAR years, tenders were numbered for the engines they were delivered with. In most cases, an oval number plate, bearing the engine number and often also the tender type, would be attached to the rear end of the tender.

Only the second batch of five Class MF locomotives were delivered new with Type XM4 tenders. They were numbered in the range from 1629 to 1633, directly onto the SAR roster, marking the introduction of the SAR renumbering scheme under the Union programme.

Classification letters
Since many tender types are interchangeable between different locomotive classes and types, a tender classification system was adopted by the SAR. The first letter of the tender type indicates the classes of engines to which it can be coupled. The "X_" tenders could be used with the locomotive classes as shown.
 Cape Government Railways Mountain, SAR Class 4.
 SAR Class 4A.
 SAR Class 5.
 Cape Government Railways 6th Class of 1897, SAR Class 6B.
 Oranje-Vrijstaat Gouwerment-Spoorwegen  6th Class L3, SAR Class 6E.
 Cape Government Railways 6th Class of 1901 (Neilson, Reid), SAR Class 6H.
 Cape Government Railways 6th Class of 1902, SAR Class 6J.
 Cape Government Railways 8th Class of 1902, SAR Class 8.
 Imperial Military Railways 8th Class, SAR Class 8A.
 CSAR Class 8-L2, SAR Class 8B.
 CSAR Class 8-L3, SAR Class 8C.
 Cape Government Railways 8th Class 4-8-0 of 1903, SAR Class 8D.
 Cape Government Railways 8th Class Experimental, SAR Class 8E.
 Cape Government Railways 8th Class 4-8-0 of 1904, SAR Class 8F.
 Cape Government Railways 8th Class 2-8-0 of 1903, SAR Class 8Y.
 Cape Government Railways 8th Class 2-8-0 of 1904, SAR Class 8Z.
 CSAR Class 9, SAR Class 9.
 CSAR Class 10, SAR Class 10.
 CSAR Class 10-2 Saturated, SAR Class 10A.
 CSAR Class 10-2 Superheated. SAR Class 10B.
 CSAR Class 10-C, SAR Class 10C.
 CSAR Class 11, SAR Class 11.
 Cape Government Railways 9th Class of 1903, SAR Class Experimental 4.
 Cape Government Railways 9th Class of 1906, SAR Class Experimental 5.
 Cape Government Railways 10th Class, SAR Class Experimental 6.
 SAR Class ME.
 CSAR Mallet Superheated, SAR Class MF.

The second letter indicates the tender's water capacity.

A number, when added after the letter code, usually indicates differences between similar tender types, such as function, wheelbase or coal bunker capacity.

References

XM4